The Templari Cattolici d'Italia (Catholic Templars of Italy) is the Knights Templar order reconstituted in Italy after the Templars were abolished on 22 March 1312 by the papal bull, Vox in excelso, issued by Pope Clement V. The Catholic Templars of Italy are a private association of Catholic faithful established according to canons 215/216 – Titulus I, de omnium christifidelium obligationibus et iuribus; can. from 321 to 326 – Titulus V, Caput III, de christifidelium consociationibus privatis of the Code of Canon Law.

The association comes to life at the beginning of the 21st century, starting from Northern Italy, and the headquarters are in the province of Parma at the church of Santa Maria Maddalena in the locality of Toccalmatto di Fontanellato. The previous location was in Verona at the church of San Fermo Maggiore, where a 13th-century medieval tomb has been found containing the remains of what may be the ninth Master General of the ancient Order of the Temple, Arnau de Torroja.

The association has expanded its horizons past the Italian peninsula and has established the order throughout the world. The Catholic Templars seek to revive the spiritual and chivalric spirit of medieval Christendom.  

Since 2012 the Catholic Templars of Italy have begun to obtain local recognition of consensus in various Italian dioceses: the Association, in fact, receives authorization to operate through diocesan recognition by at least seven bishops of large Italian cities, including Verona, Naples, Ascoli Piceno and others. The order is often welcomed at the Vatican and have been a part of important events such as the "consecration of the world to the Immaculate Heart of Mary... [and] the voluntary service during the Extraordinary Jubilee of Mercy of 2016 and the Spiritual Retreat of 2018."

Compared to other similar realities, they obtain higher average numbers: 2,500 members, 200 offices in Italy and in the world, 100 priests for the spiritual care of souls. The organization, open to the entire population of the faithful, has among its ranks men and women of all backgrounds, with a clear aptitude for voluntary service.

About 
Currently the order is not officially recognized by the Holy See as the Knights of Malta, but negotiations are under way.
However, the order is recognized as an evangelization order. The order is recognized by eight Italian dioceses (including Verona, Naples and Ascoli) to keep open shrines, preserve places of worship and help priests.
They are present in 150 locations in Italy and have 1200 members.

The order sets to "awaken the values ​​of chivalry and of the tradition of the Poor Knights of Christ called Templars , through common prayer and meditation, the defense of the Catholic faith and historical studies."

The order is not a secret or masonic association. The order sets to "fight against esotericism and rampant magic, especially among young people; cleaning operations against Satanists operating in the dioceses."

Grades and badges
 Armiger, first grade
 Miles, second grade
 Eques, third grade

Insignia

The white representing the Spirit and is obviously above the black which represents matter, as well highlighted by the Templar frescoes of the counterface of St. Bevignate in Perugia in which the Knight Templar carries shield and bipartite beauceant in which the white is at the top and the black on the bottom.

Master General

Headquarters 
 Chiesa di San Fermo Maggiore, via della Dogana, 2 – 37121, Verona, Italy

The discovery of the tomb of the Grand Master of the Knights Templar Arnold of Torroja 
In 2018 a sarcophagus was discovered in the cloister of the church of San Fermo Maggiore, Verona, containing the remains of the Grand Master of the Knights Templar, Arnold of Torroja.

Locations 
 Basilica di San Petronio, Bologna, Italy
 Abbazia di San Mercuriale, Forlì, Italy
 Chiesa dei Santi Pietro e Biagio, Cividale, Italy
 Chiesa di San Nicolò, Jesi, Italy
 Pieve di Santa Maria in acquedotto, Forlì, Italy
 Abbazia di Chiaravalle della Colomba, Alseno, Piacenza, Italy
 Sacra di San Michele, Turin, Italy
 Chiesa dell’Immacolata, Gorizia, Italy
 Beata Vergine Immacolata e S. Antonio, Milan, Italy
 Chiesa dei Santi Pietro e Paolo, Como, Italy
 Chiesa di San Michele Arcangelo, Cavaglià, Turin, Italy

The association is actively involved in the recovery, reopening and presiding of places of worship that have suffered over time abandonment, closure, deterioration or even worse desecration end 200 and more places are kept by the Templars.

Churches recovered
 Santa Maria delle Mose, Piacenza, Italy
 Chiesa dell’antico villaggio di Canossa, Reggio Emilia, Italy
 Saint Anna, Busseto, Parma, Italy
 Santa Maria Maddalena, Cerro di Toccalmatto, Fontanellato, Parma, Italy
 Santa Maria di Mucciatella, Puianello di Quattro Castella, Reggio Emilia, Italy
 Santuario della Beata Vergine Maria del Suffragio dei Poveri, Piacenza, Italy
 Oratorio di Santa Maria Immacolata, Parma, Italy
 Chiesa di Santa Maria delle Grazie al Moiariello, Capodimonte, Naples, Italy
 Chiesa di San Vincenzo, Cremona, Italy

See also
 Chinon Parchment

References

Knights Templar
Religious organisations based in Italy